Prisoner of War is a 1954 American war–drama film directed by Andrew Marton and starring Ronald Reagan, Steve Forrest, Dewey Martin and Oskar Homolka.

Plot
An American officer volunteers to be captured in order to investigate claims of abuse against American POWs in North Korean camps during the Korean War.

Cast
Ronald Reagan as Webb Sloane
Steve Forrest as Cpl. Joseph Robert Stanton
Dewey Martin as Jesse Treadman
Oskar Homolka as Col. Nikita I. Biroshilov (as Oscar Homolka)
Robert Horton as Francis Aloysius Belney
Paul Stewart as Capt. Jack Hodges
Harry Morgan as Maj. O.D. Hale
Stephen Bekassy as Lt. Georgi M. Robovnik
Leonard Strong as Col. Kim Doo Yi
Darryl Hickman as Merton Tollivar
Weaver Levy as Red Guard
Rollin Moriyama as Capt. Lang Hyun Choi
Ike Jones as Benjamin Julesberg
Clarence Lung as MVD officer
Jerry Paris as Axel Horstrom
John Lupton as Lt. Peter Reilly
Ralph Ahn as Red Guard
Peter Hansen as Capt. Fred Osborne
Strother Martin as Man on Crutches
Gordon Mitchell as Bit Role
Dick Sargent as Lt. Leonard Lee
Stuart Whitman as Captain (uncredited)
Jastin Ardiente as Captain

Production notes
The working titles of this film were The P.O.W. Story and The Prisoner of War Story.   Production Dates:  12 Dec 1953–2 Jan 1954

Capt. Robert H. Wise, who lost 90 lbs in a North Korean POW camp, served as the film's technical advisor and said that the torture scenes in the movie were based on actual incidents.

Release of the film created a minor controversy. The U.S. Army had assisted production and made edits in the script, but approval was abruptly reversed on the eve of release. The depiction of mistreatment of prisoners complicated the courts martial of POW collaborators that were proceeding at the time.

The brainwashing and abuse of American prisoners of war during the Korean War was also dramatized in P.O.W. (1953), The Bamboo Prison (1954), and The Manchurian Candidate (1962, starring Frank Sinatra).

Reception
According to MGM records the film made $785,000 in the US and Canada and $292,000 elsewhere, resulting in a profit of $111,000.

Historical accuracy
Author Robert J. Lentz of the book Korean War Filmography: 91 English Language Features through 2000 states that the film was "undeniably overstated".

References

Sources

External links

See also

1954 films
1954 drama films
American war drama films
Films directed by Andrew Marton
Metro-Goldwyn-Mayer films
Korean War prisoner of war films
1950s war drama films
American black-and-white films
1950s English-language films
1950s American films